Julian Tawanda Mavunga (born January 24, 1990) is a Zimbabwean-American professional basketball player. He is the older brother of WNBA player Stephanie Mavunga of the Indiana Fever. He played four seasons of college basketball for Miami University, where he broke Miami's career games record at 124 appearances. He was intentionally elbowed by Shiga forward Henry Walker on March 3, 2019.
His younger brother Jordache Mavunga plays for the Bambitious Nara of the B.League.

Career statistics 

|-
| align="left" |  2015-16
| align="left" | Shiga
| 51|| 49|| 31.0|| .515|| .377|| .738|| 9.6|| 3.5|| 0.7|| 0.8||  19.5
|-
| align="left" |  2016-17
| align="left" | Shiga
| 60|| 49|| 31.9|| .447|| .357|| .717|| 8.1|| 3.5|| 0.8|| 0.7||  19.5
|-
| align="left" | 2017-18
| align="left" | Kyoto
| 47|| 11|| 15.6|| .447|| .358|| .738|| 4.8|| 4.1|| 0.8|| 0.4||  15.6
|-
| align="left" | 2018-19
| align="left" | Kyoto
| 53||53||38.3||.430||.321||.753||8.7||style="background:#cfecec"|8.5||1.0||.7||21.6
|-
|}

Personal life
In July 2016, Mavunga married former Indiana Fever player Jeanette Pohlen-Mavunga.

References

External links

1990 births
Living people
American expatriate basketball people in Israel
American expatriate basketball people in Italy
American expatriate basketball people in Japan
American expatriate basketball people in Kosovo
American expatriate basketball people in Ukraine
American men's basketball players
BC Hoverla players
Ironi Nahariya players
KB Prishtina players
Kyoto Hannaryz players
Miami RedHawks men's basketball players
Pallacanestro Biella players
Power forwards (basketball)
Shiga Lakes players
Toyama Grouses players
Utsunomiya Brex players
Zimbabwean emigrants to the United States
Zimbabwean men's basketball players
Zimbabwean expatriates in Japan